Kuron is a  boma in Kauto Payam, Kapoeta East County, Namorunyang State, South Sudan.

Demographics 
According to the Fifth Population and Housing Census of Sudan, conducted in April 2008, Kuron  boma had a population of 1,857 people, composed of 1,202 male and 655 female residents.

Kuron peace village 
The Holy Trinity peace village (often simply called the Kuron peace village) is located in Kuron.  It was founded by Bishop Paride Taban in 2005.

Notes

References 

Populated places in South Sudan